Plestiodon japonicus is a species of lizard which is endemic to Japan. The IUCN lists the species as least concern.

Taxonomy 
The species was first described in 1864 by the German naturalist Wilhelm Peters as Eumeces (Pleistodon) quinquelineatus var. Japonicus. It was placed into the genus Plestiodon in 2008.  The genus Eumeces now contains African and Middle-Eastern skinks.

Description 
A similar species is Plestiodon latiscutatus which is distributed o the Izu Peninsula and the Izu Islands.

References

japonicus
Endemic reptiles of Japan
Reptiles described in 1864
Taxa named by Wilhelm Peters